Marjorie "Molly" Greene Hahn (born December 30, 1948) is an American mathematician and tennis player. In mathematics and mathematical statistics she is known for her research in probability theory, including work on central limit theorems, stochastic processes, and stochastic differential equations. She is a professor emeritus of mathematics at Tufts University.

Education
Molly Greene did her undergraduate studies at Stanford University, graduating in 1971. She went on to graduate study at the Massachusetts Institute of Technology, and married Peter Florin Hahn in 1973. Like Greene, Peter Hahn had graduated with great distinction from Stanford in 1971; he was a graduate student in mathematics at Harvard University, and went on to a career in radiology at Harvard.

Marjorie Hahn completed her Ph.D. in 1975. Her dissertation, supervised by Richard M. Dudley, was Central Limit Theorems for D[0,1]-Valued Random Variables.

Academic career
After postdoctoral study at the University of California, Berkeley, Hahn became a faculty member at Tufts University in 1977. While active at Tufts, she supervised the dissertations of 16 doctoral students, more than anyone else in the department; her students included legal statistician Weiwen Miao. She retired as professor emeritus in 2016.

In 1985, Hahn was elected as a Fellow of the Institute of Mathematical Statistics.

Tennis
Hahn is also a tennis player. She played on the Stanford team from 1967 to 1971, and passed up a chance to play tennis professionally in favor of her work in mathematics. In 2006 her name was added to the United States Tennis Association New England Hall of Fame.

In 2008 she represented the U.S. in an international seniors competition, the Alice Marble Cup, where she helped her team win a silver medal. In 2017 she was part of a U.S. team that won the Kitty Godfrey Cup for women 65 or over at the International Tennis Federation World Super-Senior team championships.

Comparing mathematics with tennis, Hahn has said "In mathematics, you try to prove things step by step; you attempt to set up a logical method. I approach tennis by using this plan and then adjust on the fly."

References

1948 births
Living people
20th-century American mathematicians
21st-century American mathematicians
American statisticians
American women mathematicians
Women statisticians
Probability theorists
Stanford University alumni
Massachusetts Institute of Technology alumni
Tufts University faculty
Fellows of the Institute of Mathematical Statistics
American female tennis players
Place of birth missing (living people)
20th-century women mathematicians
21st-century women mathematicians
Stanford Cardinal women's tennis players
20th-century American women
21st-century American women